Theodoros Tsorbatzoglou (born 4 February 1972) is the Secretary General of the European Chess Union and Secretary of FIDE Events Commission. Tsorbatzoglou was elected ECU Secretary General in 2014, and is FIDE Commissions Member since 2006. He is also a businessman in engineering, tourism and real estate sectors. He is married since 2015.

Early life and education
Tsorbatzoglou was born in Thessaloniki. His family roots coming from Izmir (Smirni) and Istanbul (Konstantinopouli) from where his grandparents moved to Thessaloniki. 
He completed master's degree of Engineering at Aristotle University of Thessaloniki, and obtained a Paper in Business Administration. 
Serving in Hellenic Army 1996-1998 he got a Diploma in "Hermes" Telecommunication System. (NATO's communication system). Tsorbatzoglou has a Certificate in E-Trade & Internet Marketing, with Special Training for European Union Programs and Funds ). He is fluent in Greek and English, and has fair knowledge in Russian.

Business career
From 1996-2004 Tsorbatzoglou had been working as an Engineer in Studies, at Supervisions in Constructions Programs. In the same time, he was trying his hand as a Consultant on EU Educational & Funding Projects (Instructor in European Training Programs, 1998-2002. Later on he performed as an E-Marketing and Conference Manager in Tourism sector (2003-2008). 
In 2008 he had been working as a Co- Producer and Host in Sports Educational TV Show Games Festival.
In 2004 he established Event Consulting Co, a Marketing & Event Management Company. Until then Tsorbatzoglou organized more than 50 events, among which scientific conferences, corporate events, various sports events and a number of International Chess Events and World Championships. 
In 2005 he started a huge annual event with the brand name Games Festival. In 2013 he established Event Properties, a Real Estate Agency which is  still developing and facing the new professional challenges.

Sports & Chess Career
Theodoros Tsorbatzoglou made his first step in chess at the age of 8. At the moment he is a former chess player and FIDE Master. He was a member of various Greek Chess National Teams during his chess career which ended in 1993. 
Tsorbatzoglou retired from a professional chess career and started working as a chess trainer. Later on he obtained a FIDE Chess Trainer title (2010) as crown of his trainers career. 
In 2008 he was appointed an Executive Vice President of Galaxias Sports & Cultural Club, and he is performing this duty ever since. Galaxias Sports & Cultural Club is a 6.000 m2 space of own Sports and Cultural facilities, including Volleyball Basketball, Chess Teams and Academies.
Since 2006 he was a Member of FIDE Commissions, and in 2010 he became a Secretary of FIDE Events Commission. During the previous mandate he was a Board Member of the European Chess Union, and in 2014 he was elected ECU Secretary General.

Social actions
During the wars in ex Yugoslavia, Tsorbatzoglou had an active role through his family in providing humanitarian help to people suffering from war consequences. He organized summer camps in Halkidiki, Greece for kids who were living in the war zones.

References

External links

Interviews 
 "Theodoros Tsorbatzoglou: This tournament can become the biggest in Europe", Chess Daily News, February 3, 2012.
 "Interview with Thessaloniki GP tournament director Theodoros Tsorbatzoglou", Chessdom, May 31, 2013.
 "Interview with Theodoros Tsorbatzoglou", Chess Daily News, May 23, 2014.
 "Moscow Open 2015 – 11th RSSU Cup has started", News Central, February 2, 2015.

1972 births
Living people
Businesspeople from Thessaloniki
Greek chess players
Sportspeople from Thessaloniki
Engineers from Thessaloniki
Chess FIDE Masters